Lampo  was the name of at least three Italian ships, and may refer to:

 , a  launched in 1899 and discarded in 1920.
 , a patrol boat launched in 1960 and retired in 1985.

Italian Navy ship names